The British Academy Video Games Award for Evolving Game is an award presented annually by the British Academy of Film and Television Arts (BAFTA). It is given in honor to "the best game that displays excellence in ongoing developer support", this includes games that "receive ongoing content and updates". 

The award was first presented at the 11th British Academy Games Awards in 2015 to League of Legends under the name of Persistent Game. The category received its  current name in 2017 at the 13th edition. Since the inception of the award, no game has ever won more than once. Epic Games' online battle royale game Fortnite holds the record for most nominations in the category, with five consecutive nominations, including a 2018 win. Square Enix's Final Fantasy XIV has the most nominations without a win, with five. Bungie is the most nominated developer, with six, as well as the most nominated without a win. Among publishers, Activision and Square Enix are tied for most nominations without a win, with five.

The current holder of the award is No Man's Sky by Hello Games, which won at the 18th British Academy Games Awards in 2022.

Winners and nominees
In the following table, the years are listed as per BAFTA convention, and generally correspond to the year of game release in the United Kingdom.

Multiple nominations

Games
The following games received two or more nominations, including their nominated updates or expansions:

Developers

Publishers

References

External links
Official website

Evolving Game